Franz Dengg (born 1 December 1928) was a West German ski jumper who competed from 1952 to 1956. He was born in Partenkirchen. He finished 31st in the individual large hill event at the 1952 Winter Olympics in Oslo. Dengg's best career finish was seventh twice, both in West Germany (1953, 1955).

External links

Olympic ski jumping results: 1948-60

1928 births
Possibly living people
Ski jumpers at the 1952 Winter Olympics
German male ski jumpers
Olympic ski jumpers of West Germany
Sportspeople from Garmisch-Partenkirchen